Ricky Alverino Sidarta (born 28 March 1995) is an Indonesian badminton player. In 2012, he joined the PB Djarum badminton club, and in 2016, he won the men's doubles title at the Manhattan Beach International tournament partnered with David Yedija Pohan.

Achievements

BWF International Challenge/Series 
Men's doubles

  BWF International Challenge tournament
  BWF International Series tournament

References

External links 
 

1995 births
Living people
People from Nganjuk Regency
Sportspeople from East Java
Indonesian male badminton players
21st-century Indonesian people